The Frontier Phantom is a 1952 American Western film produced and directed by Ron Ormond starring Lash LaRue in the final film of Ormond's Western Adventure Productions, Inc.  It was the final film of Al St. John. The majority of the film's length is taken up with a reuse of the 1949 film Outlaw Country.

Plot
Taking place 4 days after Lash and Fuzzy's breaking up of a counterfeit gang detailed in the 1949 film Outlaw Country, Lash is mistaken for his twin brother the Frontier Phantom and arrested.  At the jail, Lash relates the events of the smashing of the counterfeit outlaw gang and his meeting the last member of the gang Sam Mantell for a showdown.

Cast
Lash La Rue as Marshal Lash La Rue
Al St. John as Deputy Fuzzy Q. Jones 
 Archie Twitchell as Sheriff
 Virginia Herrick as Susan
Kenne Duncan as Sam Mantell 
 Sandy Sanders as Mantell Henchman
 Clarke Stevens as Deputy Lee
 Cliff Taylor as Sparky the Telegrapher
 Bud Osborne as Deputy Matt
Buck Garrett as Mantell henchman
 Jack O'Shea as Prisoner
George Chesebro as Cy the Bartender/Mayor

References

External links

1952 films
American Western (genre) films
1952 Western (genre) films
American black-and-white films
1950s English-language films
1950s American films